Animal liberation may refer to:

Philosophies
Animal rights, animals being considered as legal persons
Animal liberation movement
Abolitionism (animal rights), an abolitionist approach to animal rights
Veganarchism, a combined theory of animal liberation and anarchism
Anarchism and animal rights

Organizations
Animal Liberation (organisation), animal rights organisation based in Sydney, NSW
Animal Liberation Victoria
Animal Liberation Front
Animal Liberation Front Supporters Group
Revolutionary Cells – Animal Liberation Brigade
Animal Liberation Press Office

Other uses
Animal Liberation (book), 1975 book by philosopher Peter Singer
Animal Liberation (album), 1987 compilation album from WaxTrax records
Life release, a traditional Buddhist practise to save lives of beings